Zugverkehr unregelmäßig is an East German film. It was released in 1951.

Literature 
 Frank-Burkhard Habel: Das große Lexikon der DEFA-Spielfilme. Schwarzkopf & Schwarzkopf, Berlin 2000, pp. 710–711.

References

External links
 

1951 films
East German films
1950s German-language films
Films set in Berlin
German black-and-white films
1950s German films